Dilara Lokmanhekim (born 18 April 1994) is a Turkish judoka competing in the lightweight (-48 kg) division.

Lokmanhekim was born in Antalya, Turkey on 18 April 1994. She has a younger sister. She is a student of Physical Education and Sports College at Bülent Ecevit University in Zonguldak.

She was introduced to judo in the school, and began to compete in 2005. In 2013, she was seriously injured on her knee, and underwent a surgery.

She won two junior titles at the 2012 and 2014 European Championships, and another one in the under 23 category in 2012. Lokmanheim became silver medalist at the 2014 World Junior Championships in Florida, USA.

In 2015, she won the gold medal at the IJF Grand Prix held in Zagreb, Croatia. At the European Open Prague 2015, Czech Republic, she earned a bronze medal. Lokmanhekim won a bronze medal at the World Judo Masters Mohammed VI 2015 held in Rabat, Morocco. She placed 7th at the 2015 European Games in Baku, Azerbaijan. At the Judo Grand-Slam Abu Dhabi 2015, she took the bronze medal. She took the bronze medal at the 2015 IJF Grand Prix in Jeju, South Korea.

She became bronze medalist at the 2016 European Judo Championships in Kazan, Russia.

References

External links
 
 
 

1994 births
Sportspeople from Antalya
Turkish female judoka
Living people
Judoka at the 2016 Summer Olympics
Olympic judoka of Turkey
Competitors at the 2018 Mediterranean Games
European Games competitors for Turkey
Judoka at the 2015 European Games
Mediterranean Games competitors for Turkey
20th-century Turkish sportswomen
21st-century Turkish sportswomen